The sport of professional snooker has had a world ranking system in place since 1976. Certain tournaments were given "ranking" status, with the results at those events  contributing to a player's world ranking. The events that made up the 1976–77 snooker season were the first to award players with ranking points. Originally, the world rankings were decided based only on results in the World Snooker Championship, but other events were later added. The system used for the 2022–23 snooker season was first used in the 2010–11 season, where players won ranking points based entirely on prize money won from these events. The rankings are based on the prior two seasons, with eight revisions after specific tournaments throughout the season. These revisions are used as official rankings, with points awarded in the current season overwriting those from two years prior.

Ronnie O'Sullivan began the season as the highest ranked player.

Ranking list

Revision dates 
Seedings for each event were based on the world rankings, with totals being updated at specific revision dates. On these dates, ranking points from the 2020–21 snooker season were removed from a player's total.

Seeding list
The following table contains the rankings which were used to determine the seedings for following tournaments. Other provisional and unofficial rankings are produced after each ranking event which are not noted here. Blank fields indicate that the player was not active on the tour, or had no ranking. The names are initially sorted by the scores at the end of the season.

Ranking points

Below is a list of points awarded to each player for the events they participated in. Grey fields indicate that the player did not participate at the event.

Notes

References

External Links
2022/2023 Re-Ranking Points List
2022/2023 Calendar with Seeding Cut Off Points

2022
Rankings 2022